The Princeton University's collection of papyri, housed at the Princeton University, was compiled by Rosalie Cook and other papyrologists, working under the supervision of Don C. Skemer. The catalog contains 1529 inventory items, 648 of them belong to 'unidentified papyri', nearly 700 items in Greek, 260 of them are published. 115 papyri written in various scripts of the Egyptian language, only 8 Coptic papyri have been published.

The first papyri arrived at Princeton between 1901 and 1922 (90 papyri).

 Pharaonic Papyri
 Biblical manuscripts (𝔓20, 𝔓54, manuscripts of LXX) 
 Christian literature (writings of the Church Fathers)
 Greek Documentary Papyri
 Arabic Papyri

References

External links 

 at the Princeton  University Library 
 Digital Images of Selected Princeton Papyri
 Two Princeton Papyri Revised at the Bulletin of the American Society of Papyrologists 33 (1996), pp. 73–76.

Papyrology
Princeton University